Jackson Township is one of fifteen townships in DeKalb County, Indiana. As of the 2010 census, its population was 3,064 and it contained 1,155 housing units.

History
Jackson Township was founded in 1838.

Geography
Dunton Lake is in this township.

Cities and towns
 Auburn (south edge)

Unincorporated towns
 Auburn Junction
 Hopewell

Adjacent townships
 Union Township (north)
 Wilmington Township (northeast)
 Concord Township (east)
 Spencer Township (east)
 Springfield Township, Allen County (southeast)
 Cedar Creek Township, Allen County (south)
 Perry Township, Allen County (southwest)
 Butler Township (west)
 Keyser Township (west)

Cemeteries
The township contains two cemeteries: Bear Creek and Watson.

References
 
 United States Census Bureau cartographic boundary files

External links

 Indiana Township Association
 United Township Association of Indiana

Townships in DeKalb County, Indiana
Townships in Indiana
Populated places established in 1838
1838 establishments in Indiana